Rob Routs (born 10 September 1946, Australia) is a Dutch businessman. He is a former executive of Royal Dutch Shell and has recently been appointed chairman of AEGON.

Education
Routs received a Masters of Chemical Engineering degree from the Eindhoven University of Technology in the Netherlands in 1969. Following a research assignment at the University of Stockholm medical facility, he returned to the Technical University of Eindhoven, where he obtained a PhD in technical sciences in 1971.

Career
He has held a number of positions at Shell, including Exploration and Production, Montreal Refinery, Scotford Refinery, Vice President Manufacturing and Distribution Shell Canada, President Shell Canada Oil Products, Head Shell International Research and Technology Services Group Oil Products, Chief Executive Equilon. After Shell acquired Texaco's ownership in Equilon he became the President and CEO of Shell Oil Products US. He was also President of Shell Oil Company US and country Chair Shell US.

Routs became a group managing director and joined the Committee of Managing Directors (now replaced by the Executive Committee) in July 2003. He was named executive director of Shell Downstream Business in 2004. He retired from this position and as a group managing director and member of the executive committee of Shell at the end of 2008. He was succeeded by Mark Williams who reported to Routs as executive vice president of supply and distribution.

In February 2009 he was selected to replace Dudley Eustace as chairman of the insurance and pension group AEGON in 2010.

In December 2010, he was appointed to the board of directors for AECOM. He will join the AECOM Board's Audit, Nominating and Governance as well as its Planning, Finance and Investments committees.

Personal life
Routs and his wife, Janicke, have two sons and five daughters. His personal interests are opera, theatre, and tennis. He speaks English, Dutch, French, German and, to a lesser degree, Swedish and Italian.

References

External links
Rob Routs at AEGON
Robert J. Routs III at Bloomberg
Entry in the 100 most powerful businesspeople in the Netherlands 

1946 births
Living people
Dutch businesspeople
Shell plc people
Eindhoven University of Technology alumni